Karl-Georg Wellmann (born 18 November 1952) is a German politician of the Christian Democratic Union (CDU). From 2001 to 2005, he was member of the Abgeordnetenhaus, the state parliament of Berlin. Between 2005 and 2017, he was an MP of the German Bundestag.

Education and early career 
Wellmann was born in Berlin. After high school diploma, Wellmann studied business administration and law at the Technical University and the Free University of Berlin. In 1978, he completed the first, and, after being a referendary, in 1980 the second state examination in Berlin. He then worked as a lawyer. From 1981 to 1985, he was personal advisor of Senator Hanna-Renate Laurien, State Minister for Science and Research, in the government of Governing Mayor of West Berlin Richard von Weizsäcker. He later worked for the State Ministry for Health and Social Affairs. Since 1985, he has been a lawyer again, since 1997 a notary.

Political career 
In 2001, Wellmann was elected MP of the State Parliament of Berlin.

From 2005 on, Wellmann was a member of the German Bundestag; he won the seat for Steglitz-Zehlendorf directly and was re-elected there in 2009 and 2013.

In parliament, Wellmann was member of the Committee on Foreign Affairs from 2009. In addition to his committee assignment, he served as chairman of the German-Ukrainian Parliamentary Friendship Group. He was also a member of the German-Russian Parliamentary Friendship Group and the German-Belarus Parliamentary Friendship Group. A member of the German delegation to the Parliamentary Assembly of the Council of Europe (PACE), he also served on the Sub-Committee on relations with the Organisation for Economic Co-operation and Development (OECD) and the European Bank for Reconstruction and Development (EBRD).

Wellmann also was an OSCE election monitor in the Ukraine. In May 2015, Russia refused his entry at Moscow airport until the year of 2019, though he had been officially invited by the Foreign Committee of the Russian Federation Council. This was strongly criticized by the German government.

Other activities 
 German-Ukrainian Forum, Deputy Chairman
 International Bar Association (IBA), Member
 Agency for the Modernisation of Ukraine (AMU), Member (2015)
 Transatlantic Leadership Academy (TLA), Member of the Board (2005–2009)
 United Nations Association of Germany (DGVN), Member of the Board (2005–2007)

References

External links 

 Official website of Karl-Georg Wellmann
 Karl-Georg Wellmann at the German Bundestag

1952 births
Living people
Members of the Bundestag for Berlin
Members of the Abgeordnetenhaus of Berlin
Technical University of Berlin alumni
Free University of Berlin alumni
Members of the Bundestag 2013–2017
Members of the Bundestag 2009–2013
Members of the Bundestag 2005–2009
Members of the Bundestag for the Christian Democratic Union of Germany